Parandra is a genus of beetles in the family Cerambycidae, containing the following species:

 Parandra brachyderes Lameere, 1902
 Parandra brasilica Zikán, 1948
 Parandra brevicollis Lameere, 1902
 Parandra colombica White, 1853
 Parandra conspicua Tippmann, 1960
 Parandra expectata Lameere, 1902
 Parandra gilloglyi Santos-Silva & Lezama, 2010
 Parandra glaberrima Zikán, 1948
 Parandra glabra (Degeer, 1774)
 Parandra guianensis (Tavakilian, 2000)
 Parandra humboldti (Santos-Silva, 2003)
 Parandra imitatrix (Santos-Silva, 2005)
 Parandra lalannecassouorum (Tavakilian, 2000)
 Parandra longicollis Thomson, 1861
 Parandra minuscula Zikán, 1948
 Parandra monnei (Santos-Silva, 2001)
 Parandra polita Say, 1835
 Parandra scaritoides Thomson, 1861
 Parandra separanda Zikán, 1948
 Parandra solangeae (Santos-Silva, 2003)
 Parandra solisi (Santos-Silva, 2007)
 Parandra thomasi (Santos-Silva, 2002)
 Parandra tucumana Zikán, 1948
 Parandra ubirajarai (Santos-Silva, 2001)
 Parandra villei Lameere, 1885

References

Parandrinae